Count Joseph Lagrange (10 January 1763 – 16 January 1836) was a French soldier who rose through the ranks and gained promotion to the rank of general officer during the French Revolutionary Wars, subsequently pursuing a successful career during the Napoleonic Wars and winning promotion to the top military rank of General of Division. His name is inscribed on the west side of the arc de triomphe de l'Étoile. He later became a politician in Gers department – in its capital of Auch there is a portrait of him in the town museum and the gendarmerie barracks was named after him in January 2002.

Life

Revolutionary Wars
He was the son of Armand Lagrange, a merchant, and his wife Marianne Baruit. He became mayor of Lectoure in 1791 but three years later joined the army as a captain in the 2nd Gers Volunteer Battalion, fighting in Carinthia and in Tyrol during the 1796 and 1797 Italian campaigns. Rising rapidly through the ranks, he was chosen by Bonaparte to take part in the French invasion of Egypt. He fought in Egypt and Syria and rose to brigadier general on 14 July 1798. He entered Cairo at the head of the vanguard and distinguished himself at the siege of El Arish, the siege of Acre and the battle of Heliopolis. On his return from Egypt he was made inspector general of the gendarmerie and a général de division, before being put in command of the 14th Military Division on 23 September 1800. He was made a knight of the Légion d'honneur on 11 December 1803, rising to grand officer on 14 June 1804.

Napoleonic Wars

In 1805 Lagrange was made commander in chief of an expedition against the British colonies on the Antilles. Landing at Roseau, he captured the ships in the port, the garrison and its artillery and supplies before destroying the fortifications and magazines. Returning to Europe early in 1806, he was put in command of a division sent to Holland and contributed to the success of the 1806 Prussian campaign against the elector of Hesse-Cassel under the command of maréchal Mortier. He was a member of the committee which organized the Kingdom of Westphalia and so became minister of war and chief of staff to its first king, Jérôme Bonaparte.

In 1808 he was summoned to fight in the Peninsular War, where he fought in the attack on Lascanti on 18 November before pursuing the enemy to Terracina. Under maréchal Lannes he contributed to the victory at the battle of Tudela and the major losses it inflicted on Castaños. He was ordered to Germany in 1809 to command Charles I, Grand Duke of Baden's contingent. On 26 April 1810 he was made a count of the empire. He was made governor of Haute-Souabe at the start of the French invasion of Russia in 1812 and also commander of a division in 9th Army Corps. In 1813 he moved to maréchal Marmont's corps, fighting in the siege of Hoertel, the marshlands of Bobinsk, the battle of Dresden and the battle of Leipzig. He also distinguished himself in the French campaign of 1814, notably in the battle of Lesmont on 2 February 1814 and the battle of Champaubert on 10 February 1814, where he was severely wounded in the head.

Politician 
He retired to Gisors when Napoleon first fell and did not come out of retirement for the Hundred Days. He became president of Gers' electoral college in 1817 and was elected as that department's deputy on 20 September, by 513 out of 797 votes. He sat in the Royalist majority and was made inspector general of the gendarmerie again in 1818. On 1 May 1821 he was made a Grand Cross of the Légion d'honneur.

He took no part in the July Revolution of 1830. Louis-Philippe I's government appointed him to the Chamber of Peers on 9 November 1831 and allowed him to retire on 11 June 1832 at the rank of lieutenant general. He sat with the ministerial majority in the upper chamber until his death.

Marriage and issue 
On 6 November 1802 he married Marie de Talhouët (1786–1849) in the 1st arrondissement of Paris. She was the eldest daughter of Louis Céleste de Talhouët-Bonamour (1761–1812), marquis de Talhouët, and his wife Élisabeth Baude de La Vieuville (1764–1814). They had issue:

 Napoléon Joseph (1804–1812) ;
 Caroline Élisabeth (1806–1870), in 1824 married Louis Alix de Nompère de Champagny (1796–1870), 2nd duke of Cadore, son of Jean-Baptiste Nompère de Champagny, with issue ;
 Mathilde Louise (1809–1873), in 1826 married Napoléon Bessières (1802–1856), 2nd duke of Istrie, son of maréchal Bessières ;
 Emma (1810–1876), married Charles Ferron de La Ferronays (1805–1863), comte de La Ferronays, with issue ;
 Frédéric (1815–1883), in 1850 married Émilie de Riquet de Caraman (1832–1851), daughter of prince Joseph de Riquet de Caraman (1808-1886), without issue.

References

Bibliography 

 
  ;
 L'Expédition aux Antilles du Général Lagrange en 1805 par Paul Jeannin-Naltet. Société Historique du Gers. 2e Trimestre 1982

1763 births
1836 deaths
18th-century French people
19th-century French people
French generals
Counts of the First French Empire
French commanders of the Napoleonic Wars
Grand Officiers of the Légion d'honneur
Names inscribed under the Arc de Triomphe